Jérémie Janot (born 11 October 1977) is a French former professional footballer who played as a goalkeeper. He played for Saint-Étienne for 16 years of his career, and last played for Le Mans.

He set a record of 1,534 minutes without letting in a goal at the Stade Geoffroy-Guichard and was voted "goalkeeper of the year" by L'Équipe after the 2006–07 season.

Playing career
Janot signed a three-year contract with Le Mans on 2 August 2012.

Coaching career
In the summer 2014 Janot was appointed manager of US Villars' U19 squad. In the following season, he became manager of FCO Firminy.

In December 2015, he became the head coach of the PHR team of Firminy.

On 11 July 2016, Janot revealed on Twitter, that he had returned to Saint-Étienne as a goalkeeper coach for the youth teams of the club. In the following season, he joined AJ Auxerre, still as a goalkeeper coach.

In June 2019, he joined Valenciennes FC as a goalkeeper coach.

References

External links
 Official Site of Jérémie Janot 
 ASSE official profile 
 Sports.fr profile 
 

1977 births
Living people
Sportspeople from Valenciennes
Association football goalkeepers
French footballers
AS Saint-Étienne players
FC Lorient players
Le Mans FC players
Ligue 1 players
Ligue 2 players
French football managers
Footballers from Hauts-de-France
Association football goalkeeping coaches